Peter M. Cox is professor of climate system dynamics within mathematics at the University of Exeter. Until 2006 he was the Science Director - Climate Change at the Centre for Ecology and Hydrology, and before that he was at the Hadley Centre for Climate Prediction and Research (1990-2004).

References

External links 
https://www.researchgate.net/profile/Peter_Cox
https://www.youtube.com/watch?v=3bCMGjOKXeI

Academics of the University of Exeter
Living people
British climatologists
Year of birth missing (living people)